Wade–Giles is a romanization system for Mandarin Chinese. It developed from a system produced by Thomas Francis Wade, during the mid-19th century, and was given completed form with Herbert A. Giles's Chinese–English Dictionary of 1892.

The romanization systems in common use until the late 19th century were based on the Nanjing dialect, but Wade–Giles was based on the Beijing dialect and was the system of transcription familiar in the English-speaking world for most of the 20th century. Both of these kinds of transcription were used in postal romanizations (romanized place-names standardized for postal uses). In mainland China Wade–Giles has been mostly replaced by the Hanyu Pinyin romanization system, which was officially adopted in 1958, with exceptions for the romanized forms of some of the most commonly used names of locations and persons, and other proper nouns. The romanized name for most locations, persons and other proper nouns in Taiwan is based on the Wade–Giles derived romanized form, for example Kaohsiung, the Matsu Islands and Chiang Ching-kuo.

History
Wade–Giles was developed by Thomas Francis Wade, a scholar of Chinese and a British ambassador in China who was the first professor of Chinese at Cambridge University. Wade published in 1867 the first textbook on the Beijing dialect of Mandarin in English, Yü-yen Tzŭ-erh Chi, which became the basis for the romanization system later known as Wade–Giles. The system, designed to transcribe Chinese terms for Chinese specialists, was further refined in 1892 by Herbert Allen Giles (in A Chinese–English Dictionary), a British diplomat in China and his son, Lionel Giles, a curator at the British Museum.

Taiwan used Wade–Giles for decades as the de facto standard, co-existing with several official romanizations in succession, namely, Gwoyeu Romatzyh (1928), Mandarin Phonetic Symbols II (1986), and Tongyong Pinyin (2000). The Kuomintang party has previously promoted Pinyin with Ma Ying-jeou's successful presidential bid in 2008 and in a number of cities with Kuomintang elected mayors. However, the current Tsai Ing-wen administration and Democratic Progressive Party along with the majority of the people in Taiwan, both native and overseas, use spelling and transcribe their legal names in the Wade–Giles system, as well as the other aforementioned systems.

Initials and finals
The tables below show the Wade–Giles representation of each Chinese sound (in bold type), together with the corresponding IPA phonetic symbol (in square brackets), and equivalent representations in Bopomofo and Hànyǔ Pīnyīn.

Initials

Instead of ts, ts and s, Wade–Giles writes tz, tz and ss before ŭ (see below).

Finals

Wade–Giles writes -uei after k and k, otherwise -ui: kuei, kuei, hui, shui, chui.

It writes  as -o after k, k and h, otherwise as -ê: ko, ko, ho, shê, chê. When  forms a syllable on its own, it is written ê or o depending on the character.

Wade–Giles writes  as -uo after k, k, h and sh, otherwise as -o: kuo, kuo, huo, shuo, cho.

For -ih and -ŭ, see below.

Giles's A Chinese–English Dictionary also includes the syllables chio, chio, hsio, yo, which are pronounced like chüeh, chüeh, hsüeh, yüeh in Peking dialect.

Syllables that begin with a medial

Wade–Giles writes the syllable  as i or yi depending on the character.

System features

Consonants and initial symbols
A feature of the Wade–Giles system is the representation of the unaspirated-aspirated stop consonant pairs using a character resembling an apostrophe. Thomas Wade and others have used the spiritus asper ( or ), borrowed from the polytonic orthography of the Ancient Greek language. Herbert Giles and others have used a left (opening) curved single quotation mark (‘) for the same purpose. A third group used a plain apostrophe (').  The backtick, and visually similar characters are sometimes seen in various electronic documents using the system.

Examples using the spiritus asper: p, p, t, t, k, k, ch, ch. The use of this character preserves b, d, g, and j for the romanization of Chinese varieties containing voiced consonants, such as Shanghainese (which has a full set of voiced consonants) and Min Nan (Hō-ló-oē) whose century-old Pe̍h-ōe-jī (POJ, often called Missionary Romanization) is similar to Wade–Giles. POJ, Legge romanization, Simplified Wade, and EFEO Chinese transcription use the letter  instead of an apostrophe-like character to indicate aspiration. (This is similar to the obsolete IPA convention before the revisions of the 1970s).

People unfamiliar with Wade–Giles often ignore the spiritus asper, sometimes omitting them when copying texts, unaware that they represent vital information. Hànyǔ Pīnyīn addresses this issue by employing the Latin letters customarily used for voiced stops, unneeded in Mandarin, to represent the unaspirated stops: b, p, d, t, g, k, j, q, zh, ch.

Partly because of the popular omission of apostrophe-like characters, the four sounds represented in Hànyǔ Pīnyīn by j, q, zh, and ch often all become ch, including in many proper names. However, if the apostrophe-like characters are kept, the system reveals a symmetry that leaves no overlap:
 The non-retroflex ch (Pīnyīn j) and ch (Pīnyīn q) are always before either ü or i, but never ih. 
 The retroflex ch (Pīnyīn zh) and ch (Pīnyīn ch) are always before ih, a, ê, e, o, or u.

Vowels and final symbols

Syllabic consonants
Like Yale and Mandarin Phonetic Symbols II, Wade–Giles renders the two types of syllabic consonant (Wade–Giles: kung1-yün4; Hànyǔ Pīnyīn: kōngyùn) differently: 
 -ŭ is used after the sibilants written in this position (and this position only) as tz, tz and ss (Pīnyīn z, c and s).
 -ih is used after the retroflex ch, ch, sh, and j (Pīnyīn zh, ch, sh, and r).
They are typically omitted in Zhùyīn (Bōpōmōfō).

Vowel o 

What is pronounced in vernacular Peking dialect as a close-mid back unrounded vowel  is written usually as ê, but sometimes as o, depending on historical pronunciation (at the time Wade–Giles was developed). Specifically, after velar initials k, k and h (and a historical ng, which had been dropped by the time Wade–Giles was developed), o is used; for example, "哥" is ko1 (Pīnyīn gē) and "刻" is ko4 (Pīnyīn kè). When  forms a syllable on its own, Wade–Giles writes ê or o depending on the character. In all other circumstances, it writes ê.

"說" shuo1) and the three syllables of kuo, kuo, and huo (as in 過, 霍, etc.), which contrast with ko, ko, and ho that correspond to Pīnyīn ge, ke, and he. This is because characters like 羅, 多, etc. (Wade–Giles: lo2, to1; Pīnyīn: luó, duō) did not originally carry the medial . Peking dialect does not have phonemic contrast between o and -uo/wo (except in interjections when used alone) and a medial  is usually inserted in front of -o to form .

Note that Zhùyīn and Pīnyīn write  as ㄛ -o after ㄅ b, ㄆ p, ㄇ m and ㄈ f, and as ㄨㄛ -uo after all other initials.

Tones
Tones are indicated in Wade–Giles using superscript numbers (1–4) placed after the syllable. This contrasts with the use of diacritics to represent the tones in Pīnyīn. For example, the Pīnyīn qiàn (fourth tone) has the Wade–Giles equivalent chien4.

Punctuation
Wade–Giles uses hyphens to separate all syllables within a word (whereas Pīnyīn separates syllables only in specially defined cases, using hyphens or closing (right) single quotation marks as appropriate).

If a syllable is not the first in a word, its first letter is not capitalized, even if it is part of a proper noun. The use of apostrophe-like characters, hyphens, and capitalization is frequently not observed in place names and personal names. For example, the majority of overseas Taiwanese people write their given names like "Tai Lun" or "Tai-Lun", whereas the Wade–Giles is actually "Tai-lun". (See also Chinese names.)

Comparison with other systems

Pinyin
By contrast it is always present to mark the front vowel in Wade–Giles.)
After a consonant, both Wade–Giles and Pīnyīn use  and  instead of the complete syllables:  and /.

Chart

Note: In Hànyǔ Pīnyīn, the so-called neutral tone is written leaving the syllable with no diacritic mark at all. In Tongyòng Pinyin, a ring is written over the vowel.

Adaptations
There are several adaptations of Wade–Giles.

Mathews
The Romanization system used in the 1943 edition of Mathews' Chinese–English Dictionary differs from Wade–Giles in the following ways:

It uses the right apostrophe: p, t, k, ch, ts, tzŭ; while Wade–Giles uses the left apostrophe, similar to the aspiration diacritic used in the International Phonetic Alphabet before the revisions of the 1970s: p, t, k, ch, ts, tzŭ.
It consistently uses i for the syllable , while Wade–Giles uses i or yi depending on the character.
It uses o for the syllable , while Wade–Giles uses ê or o depending on the character.
It offers the choice between ssŭ and szŭ, while Wade–Giles requires ssŭ.
It does not use the spellings chio, chio, hsio, yo, replacing them with chüeh, chüeh, hsüeh, yüeh in accordance with their modern pronunciations.
It uses an underscored 3 to denote a second tone which comes from an original third tone, but only if the following syllable has the neutral tone and the tone sandhi is therefore not predictable: hsiao3•chieh.
It denotes the neutral tone by placing a dot (if the neutral tone is compulsory) or a circle (if the neutral tone is optional) before the syllable. The dot or circle replaces the hyphen.

Table

Gallery
Examples of Wade–Giles derived English language terminology:

See also

Comparison of Chinese transcription systems
Simplified Wade
Daoism–Taoism romanization issue
Legge romanization
Romanization of Chinese
Cyrillization of Chinese

References

Bibliography
Giles, Herbert A.  A Chinese–English Dictionary.  2-vol. & 3-vol. versions both.  London: Shanghai: Bernard Quaritch; Kelly and Walsh, 1892.  Rev. & enlarged 2nd ed. in 3 vols. (Vol. I: front-matter & a-hsü, Vol. II: hsü-shao, and Vol. III: shao-yün), Shanghai: Hong Kong: Singapore: Yokohama: London: Kelly & Walsh, Limited; Bernard Quaritch, 1912.  Rpt. of the 2nd ed. but in 2 vols. and bound as 1, New York: Paragon Book Reprint Corp., 1964.

Further reading
 "Library of Congress Pinyin Conversion Project Frequently Asked Questions What's the difference between Wade–Giles and Pinyin?" – Library of Congress

External links

Chinese Romanization Converter – Convert between Hànyǔ Pīnyīn, Wade–Giles, Gwoyeu Romatzyh and other known or (un-)common Romanization systems.
A conversion table of Chinese provinces and cities from Wade–Giles to Pīnyīn
Pinyin4j: Java library supporting Chinese to Wade–Giles – Support Simplified and Traditional Chinese; Support most popular Romanization systems, including Hànyŭ Pīnyīn, Tongyòng Pinyin, Wade–Giles, MPS2, Yale and Gwoyeu Romatzyh; Support multiple pronunciations of a single character; Support customized output, such as ü or tone marks.
Chinese without a teacher, Chinese phrasebook by Herbert Giles with Romanization
Chinese Phonetic Conversion Tool – Converts between Wade–Giles and other formats
Wade–Giles Annotation – Wade–Giles pronunciation and English definitions for Chinese text snippets or web pages.
國語拼音對照表 
Key to Wade–Giles romanization of Chinese characters: November 1944 (Army Map Service)

Romanization of Chinese
Writing systems introduced in 1892